NGC 272 is an open cluster (rather an 'L' shaped asterism) located in the constellation Andromeda. It was discovered on August 2, 1864 by Heinrich d'Arrest.

References

External links
 

0272
18640802
Andromeda (constellation)
Open clusters